Chetan Sankar is the Advisory Council Emeritus Professor of Management Information Systems at Raymond J. Harbert College of Business, Auburn University. He was the founder and director of the Geospatial Research and Applications Center (GRAC).

Education 
Chetan Sankar received his bachelor's degree in mechanical engineering from Regional Engineering College, Tiruchirappalli, India (now known as National Institute of Technology, Tiruchirappalli) in 1971. He obtained a Master of Business Administration (MBA) degree from Indian Institute of Management, Calcutta, in 1973. He obtained Doctor of Philosophy (PhD) degree in decision sciences and information technologies from Wharton School, University of Pennsylvania in 1981.

Awards 
 Distinguished Alumni Award from the National Institute of Technology, Tiruchirappalli, India in 2008.
 iNEER  Recognition Award by the International Network for Engineering Education and Research in 2006.

References 

Year of birth missing (living people)
Living people
National Institute of Technology, Tiruchirappalli alumni
Wharton School of the University of Pennsylvania alumni
Auburn University faculty